The 1918 Nebraska Cornhuskers football team represented the University of Nebraska in the 1918 college football season. The team was coached by first-year head coach William G. Kline and played its home games at Nebraska Field in Lincoln, Nebraska. They competed as members of the Missouri Valley Conference, though the conference did not schedule any official games due to the United States' entry into World War I. Only three NU starters from 1917 returned as many were involved in the war effort; the war also limited cross-country travel, and as a result Nebraska played only six games in the 1918 season.

Schedule

Coaching staff

Roster

Game summaries

Iowa

Sources:

Prior to Nebraska's 1918 season-opener against Iowa, the MVIAA announced that, for the first time, freshmen athletes would be permitted to participate in football games. The change was necessitated by the number of upperclassmen who were unavailable to play due to World War I or the Spanish flu. Nebraska drove to Iowa's one-yard line in the first quarter but was unable to come away with any points on what would be NU's only significant scoring chance of the day. Iowa scraped together twelve third-quarter points to win the game 12–0.

Omaha Balloon

Sources:

Two weeks prior to NU's game against the Omaha Balloon school, a training facility for Army personnel involved in the operation of dirigibles, team captain-elect Roscoe Rhodes was killed in action on October 25. The game itself was Nebraska's first in over a month; the Cornhuskers shut out the Balloon school 19–0. Nebraska halfback Elmer Schellenberg, who scored NU's second touchdown, left the team the following week to join an officers' training school. This was the only meeting between Nebraska and the Omaha Balloon School.

Kansas

Sources:

The field was so muddy for Nebraska's meeting with Kansas that the school's yearbook wrote that "the players were so completely smeared with slime that neither side could be distinguished from the other." Kansas allowed a safety on a punt attempt in the first quarter, the only scoring in the first half. Nebraska, after changing into clean uniforms at halftime, pulled away in the third quarter to win 20–0.

Camp Dodge

Sources:

Despite a significant advantage in yardage gained, Nebraska trailed 6–0 at halftime. The Cornhuskers briefly took the lead in the third quarter, but a series of late errors and missed opportunities cost Nebraska as the "Dodgers" defeated the Cornhuskers 23–7. This was the only meeting between Camp Dodge and Nebraska.

Notre Dame

Sources:

When the Armistice of 11 November 1918 ended World War I, American travel restrictions were eased and Notre Dame was able to travel to Lincoln to play a game that had twice been canceled throughout the season. NU struggled mightily to move the ball on a sloppy Nebraska Field, punting eighteen times and gaining just nine net yards of offense. Knute Rockne's first Notre Dame was also unable to get on the scoreboard, and the game ended in a 0–0 draw.

at Washington University

Sources:

Nebraska was able to add a sixth and final game to its 1918 schedule, a postseason charity game against Washington University. The Pikers, led by former Nebraska star John Rutherford, scored twenty unanswered points following an early NU touchdown to win 20–7. This was the first meeting between Nebraska and Washington University, despite several years of shared conference affiliation.

Canceled Games
Due to wartime travel restrictions and the influenza outbreak of 1918, Nebraska's scheduled games with Syracuse, Missouri, and West Virginia were canceled. The Cornhuskers resumed their annual series with Missouri in 1919, and played Syracuse the following season as well; Nebraska did not face West Virginia until the 1994 Kickoff Classic.

References

Nebraska
Nebraska Cornhuskers football seasons
Nebraska Cornhuskers football